The RTS Index (RTSI) is a free-float capitalization-weighted index of 50 Russian stocks traded on the Moscow Exchange, calculated in US dollars. The index was introduced on September 1, 1995, with the formation of the Russian Trading System (RTS) stock exchange, which later merged with Moscow Interbank Currency Exchange (MICEX) to form the Moscow Exchange.

The RTS Index was introduced with a base value of 100. It is calculated in a real-time mode. The list of stocks is reviewed every three months. The RTSI peaked on 19 May 2008 at 2,498.10 points, and fell to 492.59 on 23 January 2009.

In addition to the RTS Index, Moscow Exchange also computes and publishes the RTS Standard Index (RTSSTD), RTS-2 Index, RTS Siberia Index and seven sectoral indexes (Telecommunication, Financial, Metals & Mining, Oil & Gas, Industrial, Consumer & Retail, and Electric Utilities). The RTS Standard and RTS-2 are compiled similarly to the RTS Index, from a list of top 15 large-cap stocks and 50+ second-tier stocks, respectively.

Annual returns 
The following table shows the annual development of the RTS Index since 1995.

Components
From September 22, 2017 the composition of the RTS Index is the following:

See also
 MOEX Russia Index

References

External links
RTS Index (English)
MICEX-RTS (Russian) 
MICEX-RTS (English) 
 RTSI profile on Wikinvest
 Bloomberg page for RTSI$:IND

Russian stock market indices